Touken Ranbu Warriors is a hack and slash video game for Nintendo Switch and Windows co-developed by Omega Force and Ruby Party, published in Japan by DMM Games in Japan and in the west by Koei Tecmo. It is a spin-off based on the long-running Touken Ranbu series, crossing  with the gameplay of the Warriors series.

Gameplay
The gameplay is modeled after the hack-and-slash Warriors series, in which the player controls a single character to defeat enemies throughout a stage while trying to achieve a specific goal. Players control various characters from the Touken Ranbu series. Between missions, players can participate in various mini-games and dating sim elements, to grow the relationships between the characters.

Story
In Touken Ranbu Warriors,  the Touken Danshi, without their master Saniwa-to in sight, have been aimlessly drifting through time, until getting attacked by the History Retrograde Army. Approached by the Government of the Time, the Touken Danshi are sent out to stop the Histroy Retrograde Army, who aim to change Japan's history. They time travel through Sengoku-era Japan to correct history itself.

Development
In August 2021, Koei Tecmo announced that Touken Ranbu Warriors was in development. The game is jointly developed by Omega Force and Ruby Party, with Ruby Party handling the story and simulation aspects, and Omega Force handling the combat. 

Ruby Party Producer Mei Erkawa mentioned that they've been wanting to expand globally, and with Touken Ranbu Warriors they were given this opportunity. Erikawa mentioned that the market for otome games used to be small, but has risen significantly in populiarty in recent years with the advent of mobile and browser games such as Touken Ranbu. Touken Ranbu Warriors was made with the intention of appealing to those who wanted to play something more involved, hence why the game released on Nintendo Switch.

The game was released for the Nintendo Switch and Windows on February 17, 2022 in Japan. It was later released on May 24, 2022, in North America and Europe for the Nintendo Switch and Steam.

Reception

Notes

References

External links

2022 video games
Crossover video games
Crowd-combat fighting games
Hack and slash games
Koei games
Omega Force games
Nintendo Switch games
Single-player video games
Video games about samurai
Video games about time travel
Video games developed in Japan
Warriors (video game series)
Windows games